Annette Schultz (later Klatt, born 1 September 1957) is a German former volleyball player who competed for East Germany in the 1980 Summer Olympics.

She was born in Jena.

In 1980 she was part of the East German team which won the silver medal in the Olympic tournament. She played all five matches.

External links
 profile

1957 births
Living people
Sportspeople from Jena
People from Bezirk Gera
German women's volleyball players
Olympic volleyball players of East Germany
Volleyball players at the 1980 Summer Olympics
Olympic silver medalists for East Germany
Olympic medalists in volleyball
Medalists at the 1980 Summer Olympics
Recipients of the Patriotic Order of Merit in bronze
20th-century German women